Vegard Stake Laengen (born 7 February 1989) is a Norwegian professional road racing cyclist, who currently rides for UCI WorldTeam .

Career
Born in Oslo, Laengen competed for Norway at the 2012 and 2016 Olympics. In August 2015  confirmed that Laengen would be leaving the team to join  for 2016. He was named in the start list for the 2016 Giro d'Italia and the 2016 Vuelta a España. In June 2017, he was named in the startlist for the Tour de France.

Personal life
Laengen currently resides in Fredrikstad, Norway.

Major results

2009
 10th Rogaland GP
2010
 1st  Overall Giro della Regione Friuli Venezia Giulia
 4th Road race, National Road Championships
 9th Overall Tour Alsace
2011
 National Road Championships
2nd Road race
4th Time trial
 3rd  Time trial, UEC European Under-23 Road Championships
 3rd Overall Le Triptyque des Monts et Châteaux
 4th Overall Tour de l'Avenir
 5th Overall Tour Alsace
 7th Ronde van Vlaanderen Beloften
2012
 1st Stage 5 Tour de Beauce
 5th Road race, National Road Championships
2013
 2nd Overall Kreiz Breizh Elites
 3rd Tour du Doubs
2014
 9th Boucles de l'Aulne
2015
 1st  Overall Tour Alsace
1st Stage 3
 2nd Overall Ronde de l'Oise
1st Stage 3
 2nd Chrono Champenois
 National Road Championships
3rd Road race
4th Time trial
 3rd Hadeland GP
 4th Ringerike GP
2016
 2nd Time trial, National Road Championships
2017
 6th Overall Tour of California
 8th Gran Premio di Lugano
 9th Overall Colorado Classic
  Combativity award Stage 6 Tour de France
2018
 1st  Road race, National Road Championships
 10th Overall Tour of Slovenia
2021
 2nd Trofeo Andratx – Mirador d'Es Colomer

Grand Tour general classification results timeline

References

External links

 
 
 
 
 
 
 
 Vegard Stake Laengen at Bretagne-Séché Environnement
 Vegard Stake Laengen at Cycling Base

1989 births
Living people
Sportspeople from Fredrikstad
Norwegian male cyclists
Olympic cyclists of Norway
Cyclists at the 2012 Summer Olympics
Cyclists at the 2016 Summer Olympics
Cyclists from Oslo
21st-century Norwegian people